Sir Richard Francis Morgan (21 February 1821 – 27 January 1876) was a Ceylonese (Sri Lankan) lawyer, who served as the 13th Queen's Advocate of Ceylon and acting Chief Justice of Ceylon. He was the first Asian in the British Empire to receive a Knighthood and first Ceylonese to be a member of the Governor's Executive Council and was an unofficial (Burgher) member of the Legislative Council of Ceylon. He was the Crown Advocate who prosecuted famed bandit Saradiel.

Sir Richard was the 11th and youngest child of Owen Richard Morgan, port magistrate of Colombo, and Behrana Lucretea Lourensz. He was educated at the Colombo Academy.

Morgan was knighted in 1874, while serving as Crown Advocate of Ceylon. He was made acting Chief Justice of Ceylon, after E. S. Creasy had returned to England on sick leave. His son was Lieutenant Colonel Richard Hillebrand Morgan.

See also
Whist Bungalow

References

Citations

Bibliography

External links
Reclaiming the Burgher heritage
K.M.C.'s first meeting - 138 years ago 
A record, painstakingly assembled 

1821 births
1876 deaths
Acting Chief Justices of British Ceylon
Puisne Justices of the Supreme Court of Ceylon
Attorneys General of British Ceylon
Members of the Legislative Council of Ceylon
People from Colombo
Alumni of Royal College, Colombo
Ceylonese advocates
Ceylonese Knights Bachelor
People from British Ceylon
British Ceylon judges
Burgher civil servants